Maria Claudia Pulido is a Colombian human rights lawyer and Acting Executive Secretary of the Inter-American Commission on Human Rights (IACHR) since 17 August 2020. She succeeded Paulo Abrão after Organization of American States Secretary General Luis Almagro announced that he would not renew Abrão's contract as Executive Secretary of the IACHR.

References 

Colombian women lawyers
Executive Secretaries of the Inter-American Commission on Human Rights
Year of birth missing (living people)
Living people
21st-century Colombian lawyers